Ptochostola microphaeellus is a species of moth of the family Crambidae. It is found in Australia, including Tasmania.

References

Crambinae
Moths described in 1866
Moths of Australia
Taxa named by Francis Walker (entomologist)